San Antonio de los Altos is a suburban town, capital of Los Salias Municipality, Miranda State, Venezuela with a population of 68,255 in 2011. The town was named after Saint Anthony of Padua, a Portuguese Catholic priest, the patron saint of the city and the mountainous area around it.

Geography 
San Antonio de los Altos is part of the Altos Mirandinos Metropolitan Area, which is, in itself part of the Metropolitan Region of Caracas. San Antonio is the highest point in the Altos Mirandinos area.

References

Cities in Miranda (state)
Populated places established in 1683
1683 establishments in the Spanish Empire